Sunuapa is a town and one of the 119 Municipalities of Chiapas, in southern Mexico.

As of 2010, the municipality had a total population of 2,235, up from 1,936 as of 2005. It covers an area of 178.9 km².

The municipality had 15 localities, none of which had a population over 1,000.

References

Municipalities of Chiapas